The Hartland Railroad Depot in Hartland, Wisconsin is a railroad depot built in 1879 for the Chicago, Milwaukee, and St. Paul Railroad. The depot was the third depot to be built in Hartland. The first depot was built in 1854 with the arrival of the Milwaukee and Watertown Railroad. This was replaced in 1869, but that depot fell victim to a lightning strike and burned down. Therefore, the current Italianate brick depot was built as a replacement. In 1899, the railroad decided to build a more impressive depot, and the 1879 structure was moved slightly to the west to become a freight depot. However, the 1899 depot was destroyed in a 1916 fire and replaced with another depot in 1917, which served until 1969 before being demolished.

The 1879 Italianate depot is the only one of the five depots in Hartland to survive. The depot incorporated an agent's quarters, a waiting room and a freight room. It was listed on the National Register of Historic Places on April 21, 1988.

References 

 Chicago Milwaukee & St. Paul Railroad Depot National Register of Historic Places Inventory-Nomination Form, 1985. On file at the National Park Service.

Railway stations on the National Register of Historic Places in Wisconsin
National Register of Historic Places in Waukesha County, Wisconsin
Former railway stations in Wisconsin
Italianate architecture in Wisconsin
Railway stations in the United States opened in 1879
Hartland